Opperman or Oppermann may refer to:

People
 Ashley Opperman (born 1983), South African footballer
 Chris Opperman (born 1978), American composer
 D. J. Opperman (1914–1985), Afrikaans poet
 Dwight D. Opperman, American businessman
 Frank Opperman (South African actor) (born 1960), South African actor
 George Opperman (1935–1985), graphic artist
 Guy Opperman (born 1965), British politician
 Sir Hubert Opperman (1904–1996), Australian cycling champion, politician and diplomat
 Ian Opperman (born 1989), Namibian cricketer
 Ian James Oppermann, Australian engineer
 Jan Opperman (1939–1997), American racecar driver
 Kalmen Opperman (1919–2010), American clarinetist
 Rüdiger Oppermann (born 1954), German harpist
 Thomas Oppermann (1954–2020), German politician

Places
Opperman, Ohio

Mathematics
 Oppermann's conjecture

Organisations
 Opperman, English tractor manufacturer 
 Oppermann Automobiles, English car manufacturer

Legal cases
 South Dakota v. Opperman

Literature 
 The Oppermanns, a 1933 novel by Lion Feuchtwanger

See also